This All Happened More or Less is a 2014 outdoor public art installation by Crystal Schenk and Shelby Davis, located along Southeast Division Street in Portland, Oregon, United States.

Description and history

This All Happened More or Less is a sculpture installation, and the first public art commission, by local artists Crystal Schenk and Shelby Davis. The work consists of eight small bronze statues, or "characters", on large dolomite boulders quarried in the Pacific Northwest, "strategically" placed along Southeast Division Street, between 11th and 36th Avenues. The stones are sited adjacent to bioswales and near businesses. Schenk and Davis based the statues on the activities they observed on Southeast Division, and hoped pedestrians would "take their time to stroll along the street and discover all of the sculptures". The artists have said, "We are merely suggesting stories and we want people to draw their own conclusions, to fill in all of the details, and to follow their imaginations." According to the Regional Arts & Culture Council, which administers the installation, the work "can draw a viewer in close enough to imagine a story behind each of the figures that vary from active, such as a kid on a skateboard, to inactive, such as waiting for a bus or sitting quietly with a pet dog."

This All Happened More or Less was installed with other streetscape improvements along Southeast Division and funded by the city's 2% for Art program. The installation was commemorated at Openfest on October 24, 2014.

Reception
In 2015, the work was one of three 2014 public art projects in the city, and 31 in the United States, recognized by Americans for the Arts as among the best in the country.

See also
 2014 in art

References

External links

 This All Happened More or Less at Americans for the Arts
 This All Happened More or Less at the Public Art Archive
 This All Happened More or Less at the Regional Arts & Culture Council
 MFA grads' art installation sets Division in stone by Ruby King (November 13, 2014), PSU Vanguard (Portland State University)

2014 establishments in Oregon
2014 sculptures
Bronze sculptures in Oregon
Hosford-Abernethy, Portland, Oregon
Outdoor sculptures in Portland, Oregon
Richmond, Portland, Oregon
Statues in Portland, Oregon
Stone sculptures in Oregon